The 1983 Virginia Slims World Championship Series was the 13th season since the foundation of the Women's Tennis Association. It commenced on January 3, 1983, and concluded on March 4, 1984, after 64 events.

The Virginia Slims World Championship Series was the elite tour for professional women's tennis organised by the Women's Tennis Association (WTA). It was held in place of the WTA Tour from 1983 until 1987 and featured tournaments that had previously been part of the Toyota Series and the Avon Series. The circuit consisted of 48 tournaments in nine countries, including the four Grand Slam tournaments, and culminated in the season-ending Virginia Slims Championships played in February 1984. ITF tournaments were not part of the tour, although they awarded points for the WTA World Ranking.

Martina Navratilova was the most successful player in both singles and doubles across the season. She won three of the four Grand Slam tournaments in singles, with Chris Evert-Lloyd winning the French Open. In doubles, Navratilova again won all the Grand Slams apart from the French Open, which was collected by Rosalyn Fairbank and Candy Reynolds; Pam Shriver was her partner in all the Grand Slam events. Navratilova won a total of 29 titles in the course of the year and only suffered one defeat in singles, against Kathy Horvath at the French Open. This led to her beginning and ending the year as the WTA number 1. Shriver was her closest challenger with 16 titles, including 14 in doubles events. Players from the United States won 74 of the 125 titles awarded in singles, doubles and mixed doubles; players from Brazil, Canada, Japan, New Zealand, Netherlands and Switzerland each won a solitary title.

Tour changes
Avon, who had been the sponsors of the January to March U.S. winter circuit of the WTA Tour since 1978, announced in 1982 that they would be trimming back their sponsorship of the tour. Toyota, who sponsored the international tour for the remaining nine months of the season, also withdrew their support. The 1983 season saw Virginia Slims returning to sponsor a unified worldwide tour after an absence of four years. The company sponsored events between 1970 and 1978 but withdrew their support following disagreements with the organisers of the WTA Tour, the Women's Tennis Association. However the company decided to associate themselves with the women's tennis circuit again in 1983. The tour was therefore known as the Virginia Slims World Championship Series, with 18 events including the US Open held in the United States and a further 12 events in six other countries incorporated under the Virginia Slims brand in a merged season.

Season summary

Singles
World number-one singles player Martina Navratilova, who had won 90 out of 93 matches the previous year, began the 1983 season in great form, winning successive titles in Washington and Houston, defeating Sylvia Hanika in the final on both occasions. The third best player in the world, Andrea Jaeger, won the tournament at Marco Island in Florida; Chris Evert-Lloyd, the world number two, took the title at Palm Beach, also in Florida.

Schedule
The table below shows the 1983 Virginia Slims World Championship Series schedule.

Key

January

February

March

April

May

June

July

August

September

October

November

December
No events were held this month

January 1984

February 1984

Rankings

Singles
Below are the 1983 WTA year-end rankings (December 5, 1983) in singles competition:

Points distribution
Virginia Slims ranking points distribution.

Statistical information

Titles won by player
These tables present the number of singles (S), doubles (D), and mixed doubles (X) titles won by each player and each nation during the season, within all the tournament categories of the 1983 Virginia Slims World Championship Series: the Grand Slam tournaments, the Year-end championships and regular events. The players/nations are sorted by:

total number of titles (a doubles title won by two players representing the same nation counts as only one win for the nation);
highest amount of highest category tournaments (for example, having a single Grand Slam gives preference over any kind of combination without a Grand Slam title);
a singles > doubles > mixed doubles hierarchy;
alphabetical order (by family names for players).

Titles won by nation

The following players won their first title in singles (S), doubles (D) or mixed doubles (X):
 Lori McNeil – Bakersfield (D)
 Bonnie Gadusek – Deerfield Beach (D)
 Sandy Collins – Kansas (D)
 Kyle Copeland – Bakersfield (D)
 Chris O'Neil – Kitzbühel (D)
 Christiane Jolissaint – Lugano (D)
 Catherine Tanvier – Filderstadt (S)
 Pascale Paradis – Kitzbühel (S)
 Kim Shaefer – Hartford (S)
 Ginny Purdy – Pittsburgh (S)
 Etsuko Inoue – Japan Open (S)
 Jennifer Mundel-Reinbold – Bakersfield (S)
 Rosalyn Fairbank –  Richmond (S)
 Jo Durie – Mahwah (S)
 Anne Hobbs – Indianapolis (S)
 Elizabeth Sayers – Ridgewood (D), US Open (X)
 Yvonne Vermaak – Palm Springs (S)
 Barbara Jordan – French Open (X)
 Andrea Temesvári – Perugia (S)
 Kathleen Horvath – Nashville (S)
 Alycia Moulton – Ridgewood (S)
 Bettina Bunge – Hamburg (D)
 Pam Whytcross – Kitzbühel (D)
 Chris O'Neil – Borden Classic (D)
The following players mounted a successful title defence in singles (S), doubles (D) or mixed doubles (X):
 Martina Navratilova – Washington (S), Chicago (S,D), Dallas (S,D), New York Masters (D), Hilton Head (S,D), Orlando (S), Eastbourne (S,D), Wimbledon (S, D), Montreal (S), Stuttgart (S, D), Australian Open (D)
 Chris Evert-Lloyd – Palm Beach (S), Amelia Island (S), Deerfield Beach (S)
 Billie Jean King (S)
 Lisa Bonder – Borden Classic (S)
 Pam Shriver – Houston (D), Chicago (D), Dallas (D), New York Masters (D), Eastbourne (D), Wimbledon (D), Brighton (D), Australian Open (D)
 Sharon Walsh – New Jersey (D)
 Candy Reynolds – Richmond (D)

Retirements
The following are notable players who announced their retirement from women's tennis in 1983.

 Anne Smith
 Billie Jean King
 Evonne Goolagong
 Tanya Harford

See also
 1983 Volvo Grand Prix – men's circuit
 Women's Tennis Association
 International Tennis Federation

Notes
 The tournament was halted by rain delays on 23 occasions over the first five days. The tournament was eventually cancelled after players rejected the officials attempts to move the tournament indoors.
Martina Navratilova only lost one match during the whole year, against Kathleen Horvath in the fourth round of the French Open.

References

External links
Official WTA Tour website

 
WTA Tour
1983 WTA Tour